Polymixis iatnana is a moth of the family Noctuidae. It is found on Cyprus.

Taxonomy
Polymixis iatnana was formerly treated as a subspecies Polymixis serpentina.

References

External links

Lepiforum.de

Moths described in 1996
Cuculliinae